Al-Awja is a village 8 miles (13 km) south of Tikrit, Iraq on the western bank of the Tigris. It is mainly inhabited by Sunni Arabs.

The village is known for being the hometown and place of burial of former Iraqi President Saddam Hussein.

When Saddam was captured by Task Force 121 and 4th Infantry Division during Operation Red Dawn, he was hidden only a few miles from his hometown of Ad-Dawr. Saddam Hussein was buried in this village before dawn on December 31, 2006, less than 24 hours after his execution took place.

During the fighting in the Second Battle of Tikrit, Saddam Hussein's tomb was levelled by ISIS. After Iraqi forces took control of the village, Shia militiamen of the Popular Mobilization Committee put its insignia around the village, including that of Major General Qassem Soleimani.

References

Awja
Populated places on the Tigris River
Saddam Hussein